RK Zamet is a Croatian handball club. This article details their record in European handball competitions.

History
RK Zamet have participated in four EHF competitions. Their first appearance in Europe was in 1992 when they played Laško Pivovara Celje in the first round of European Cup. Zamet has appeared one in the EHF Champions League (then European Cup) and EHF Challenge Cup (then called City Cup), three time in the EHF Cup Winners' Cup and five time in the EHF Cup.

The club's greatest achievement was reaching the fourth round in 2002-03 EHF Cup where they lost to Dinamo Viktor Stavropol. During the second match a in Rijeka second before the end of the first half a brawl started near the scoretable with Zlatko Saračević and Vitalij Andronov. Both teams started fighting and some fans joined in and beath the Russian players. The EHF fined Zamet with a loss of 0:10, a fine of €7,500 and Zamet were punished with not being able to play a European match on their field for a year.

By competition

Source: eurohandball.com Last updated on 26 November 2016.Pld = Matches played; W = Matches won; D = Matches drawn; L = Matches lost; GF = Goals for; GA = Goals against. Defunct competitions indicated in italics.

Summary by ground

Source: eurohandball.com Last updated on 26 November 2016.Pld = Matches played; W = Matches won; D = Matches drawn; L = Matches lost; GF = Goals for; GA = Goals against. Defunct competitions indicated in italics.

Matches by season

Source: , Last updated on 29 September 2016.

Record wins and defeats
 Home win: 16:25 v. HCE Tongeren, 2000-01, 12 November 2000
 Away win: 32:21 v. Siauliai Universitetas, 2001-02, 11 November 2001
 Home defeat: 23:34 v. MT Melsungen, 2016-17, 19 November 2016
 Away defeat: 32:20 v. MT Melsungen, 2016-17, 26 November 2016

Record by country of opposition
Updated on 26 November 2016.

Player records
Most appearances in EHF club competitions:
 27 appearances: Milan Uzelac
Most goals in EHF club competitions:
 Mateo Hrvatin

Coaching records
Most appearances in EHF club competitions:
 14 appearances: Damir Čavlović

References

RK Zamet